Horia Tecău (born January 19, 1985) is a Romanian former professional tennis player who specialised in doubles.

He is a three-time Grand Slam champion, having won the 2015 Wimbledon Championships and 2017 US Open alongside Jean-Julien Rojer in men's doubles, as well as the 2012 Australian Open with Bethanie Mattek-Sands in mixed doubles. Tecău also reached five further Grand Slam finals: at the 2010, 2011 and 2012 Wimbledon Championships with Robert Lindstedt in men's doubles, and at the 2014 and 2016 Australian Opens in mixed doubles.

He reached his career-high doubles ranking of world No. 2 in November 2015, shortly before winning the 2015 ATP Finals with Rojer. Tecău won 38 doubles and one mixed doubles titles on the ATP Tour, including three at Masters 1000 level. He also won the silver medal at the 2016 Olympic Games in Rio de Janeiro, alongside compatriot Florin Mergea.

Career

2010
On January 16, 2010, Tecău won his first ATP doubles title at the Auckland Open, partnering Marcus Daniell.

He showed strong form in early 2010 and won two doubles titles, (one Challenger and one ATP World Tour 250 Series), at Marrakech and Casablanca, which confirmed his good form.

He won his third doubles title at 's-Hertogenbosch and his second with partner Robert Lindstedt (his first with him came in Casablanca).

At Wimbledon, Tecău reached, for the first time in his career, a Grand Slam doubles final. He and his partner, Robert Lindstedt, defeated the pair of Tommy Robredo and Marcel Granollers in four sets in the quarterfinals and in the semifinals the duo of Juan Ignacio Chela and Eduardo Schwank. In the final, Tecău and Lindstedt were defeated by the pair of Jürgen Melzer and Philipp Petzschner.

At Wimbledon in the mixed doubles, he and his partner, fellow Romanian Monica Niculescu, lost in the second round to Marcelo Melo and Rennae Stubbs.

At the Swedish Open, Lindstedt and Tecău won their third title together winning the final against Andreas Seppi and Simone Vagnozzi.

At the Los Angeles Open, Tecău and Lindstedt were defeated by Eric Butorac and Jean-Julien Rojer in the quarterfinals. At the Washington Open, they were defeated by the pair of Marcos Baghdatis and Stanislas Wawrinka in the first round.

The fifth title of Tecău's career and fourth partnering Lindstedt came at the Connecticut Open. The final saw them beating Rohan Bopanna and Aisam-ul-Haq Qureshi, this being their second title win against the Indian-Pakistani pair.

2011
Horia started season alongside his partner Lindstedt at the Brisbane International. They had a good start and reached the final of the tournament but a calf injury of Lindstedt forced them to retire after just one set and thus losing the match to the Lukáš Dlouhý/Paul Hanley pair. At the Auckland Open, Horia was the defending champion and seeded No. 1 with Robert but they were forced to withdraw due to the Swede's left calf injury sustained just days earlier.

At the Australian Open Horia and Robert were eleventh seed but despite leading 1–0 in the first round match against wildcards Colin Ebelthite and Adam Feeney they were forced to retire yet again due to Robert's injury.

After the year's first Grand Slam, Horia decided to give his partner, Robert, time to recover and paired with experienced doubles player, Belgian Dick Norman, for the Zagreb Indoors. This was a successful choice and they reached the tournament final and won it.

Following the Zagreb title, Horia paired for the next two tournaments with Austrian Julian Knowle and Pakistani Aisam-ul-Haq Qureshi but with little success, exiting both competitions after the first round. He then paired with fellow countryman Victor Hănescu for their biggest doubles title to date, the 500 point Mexican Open. In the final, they beat Brazilians Marcelo Melo and Bruno Soares in straight sets.

In April, Horia and Lindstedt defended their title in Casablanca, after an impressive display and losing just one set in the first round of the tournament.

He had a good grass-court season with two finals together with Lindstedt, losing in the final of Wimbledon to the Bryan twins.

At the return to clay, he defended his win at Swedish Open, again with Lindstedt.

2012: Masters 1000 doubles title, end of doubles relationship with Lindstedt

Tecău and Bethanie Mattek-Sands won the Australian Open mixed-doubles final on 29 January. He reached the semifinals in men's doubles with Lindstedt and lost to Bob and Mike Bryan in a close three-setter. Together they also reached the final of a Masters 1000 for the first time at the 2012 Mutua Madrid Open.

At the Summer Olympics, Tecău and teammate Adrian Ungur lost in the first round.

In August 2012, Tecău and Lindstedt won the biggest title together, the Masters 1000 title at the 2012 Western & Southern Open in Cincinnati.

Tecău and Lindstedt separated in September 2012 after a fruitful three-year relationship where they won a total of 10 titles.

2013: Three more doubles titles with Mirnyi
Tecău paired up with Max Mirnyi for 2013. They reached five finals and won three of them.

2014–2019: Two Grand Slam doubles titles, world No. 2, Olympic Silver

Tecău and his partner Jean-Julien Rojer won 2015 Wimbledon defeating Jamie Murray and John Peers in the final and the 2017 US Open defeating Feliciano López and Marc López in the final.

He won the 2016 BRD Năstase Țiriac Trophy and the silver medal at the 2016 Olympic Games in Rio de Janeiro with Florin Mergea.

2020–2022: Major doubles semifinal, an ATP title, and retirement
He qualified with his new partner German Kevin Krawietz on 4 November 2021 for the 2021 ATP Finals with whom he won his 38th title in Halle. Tecău played his last match at the 2021 ATP Finals before his retirement.
However he postponed his retirement when he was called back to play doubles in the 2022 Davis Cup with Marius Copil where they won their match against Spain duo Alejandro Davidovich Fokina and Pedro Martínez (tennis).
He was announced as the Billie Jean King Cup captain for Romania in March 2022.

Personal life
Tecău was chosen by Sony Pictures to dub Charles Darwin's voice in Romanian in the animated movie The Pirates! In an Adventure with Scientists!.

Significant finals

Grand Slam finals

Doubles: 5 (2 titles, 3 runner-ups)

Mixed doubles: 3 (1 title, 2 runner-ups)

Year-end championships

Doubles: 1 (1 title)

Masters 1000 finals

Doubles: 6 (3 titles, 3 runner-ups)

Olympic medal matches

Doubles: 1 (silver medal)

ATP career finals

Doubles: 62 (38 titles, 24 runner-ups)

Performance timelines

Doubles

1 Held as Hamburg Masters (outdoor clay) until 2008, Madrid Masters (outdoor clay) 2009 – present.
2 Held as Stuttgart Masters (indoor hard) until 2001, Madrid Masters (indoor hard) from 2002 to 2008, and Shanghai Masters (outdoor hard) 2009 – present.

Mixed doubles

ATP Challenger and ITF Futures finals

Singles: 6 (5 titles, 1 runner-up)

Doubles: 38 (20 titles, 18 runner-ups)

Junior Grand Slam finals

Boys' doubles: 4 (2 titles, 2 runner–ups)

ATP Tour career earnings

References

Publication

External links

 
 
 
 
 

1985 births
Sportspeople from Constanța
Romanian male tennis players
Living people
Wimbledon junior champions
Tennis players at the 2012 Summer Olympics
Tennis players at the 2016 Summer Olympics
Olympic tennis players of Romania
Olympic silver medalists for Romania
Grand Slam (tennis) champions in men's doubles
Grand Slam (tennis) champions in mixed doubles
Medalists at the 2016 Summer Olympics
Olympic medalists in tennis
Australian Open (tennis) champions
Wimbledon champions
US Open (tennis) champions
Grand Slam (tennis) champions in boys' doubles
ITF World Champions